Deranged Records is a Canadian punk record label based in Roberts Creek, British Columbia. It was founded in 1999 by Gordon Dufresne. Notable bands who have had releases with the label are Fucked Up, Career Suicide and Brutal Knights. The label is known for releasing hardcore punk; however, more recently they have been releasing albums that are more pop punk.

Discography
 86 Mentality - Final Exit  7-inch
 Agna Moraine's Autobiography - 7-inch 
 Anomie - Mrta Benefit LP  
 The Bayonettes - Stuck in this Rut 7-inch
 The Bayonettes - We're Doomed EP
 Born Dead Icons - Part Of Something... 7-inch
 Brain Killer - Demo 7-inch
 Brain Killer - s/t 7-inch
 Brain Killer - Every Actual State is Corrupt LP
 Brutal Knights - Not Fun EP
 Brutal Knights - Living by Yourself
 Career Suicide - 2001 to 2003 CD 
 Career Suicide - Sars 7-inch 
 Career Suicide/Jed Whitey - split 12-inch 
 Casanovas In Heat - Ruins 7-inch
 Countdown to Oblivion - Brain Surgery... 7-inch 
 Crude - Immortality LP/CD 
 Dead Stop - Done With You LP / CD 
 Demon System 13 - For The Kids... 7-inch
 Demon System 13 - No One Will Thank You... CD 
 Demon System 13 - Vad Vet Vi om Kriget? CD/LP 
 Dumbstruck - If It Ain't Broke... 7-inch 
 Drift/Jonah - split 7-inch 
 D.S.B. - No Fight No Get 7-inch 
 E.T.A. - No Faith LP/CD 
 E.T.A. - We Are The Attack 7-inch 
 Exclaim - Keep Things Evolving Positively 7-inch
 Flowers of Evil - Self Titled LP 
 Fucked Up - Baiting The Public 7-inch 
 Fucked Up - Dance of Death 7-inch 
 Fucked Up - Epics In Minutes CD 
 Fucked Up - No Pasaran 7-inch 
 Fucked Up- Police 7-inch 
 Fucked Up - Hidden World
 Hacksaw - Turned Up Turned Down CD/LP 
 Hammer - LP (Japanese Text) 
 Hammer- Raw Tracks 2000 7-inch 
 Haymaker - Fuck America 7-inch 
 Haymaker - Love The Music, Hate The Kids 7-inch 
 Haymaker - It Only Gets Worse LP/CD 
 Haymaker - Lost Tribe 7-inch 
 Highscore- New Fuel LP 
 Holier than Thou? - High On Barbecue LP
 Holier than Thou? - Riviera Sessions CD 
 Intensity - The Ruins of Our Future LP 
 Jonah - 7-inch
 Last in Line - Crosswalk 7-inch 
 Leatherface - Discography Part 2: Rare & Unreleased LP 
 Look Back and Laugh - Street Terrorism - 7-inch 
 Male Nurses - s/t 7-inch 
 Minnow - 7-inch 
 Neo Cons - S/T 7-inch
 Neo Cons - Idiot Circus 7-inch 
 NK 6 - Keep On Keeping On LP/CD 
 No Class - S/T 12-inch LP 
 Nomos - Demo 7-inch 
 Nomos- Notes From The Acheron 12-inch 
 The Observers - Lead Pill 7-inch 
 Our War - If You're Not Now... CD/10" 
 Out Cold - Will Attack If Provoked LP 
 Out Cold/Voorhees - split LP 
 Rammer - 7-inch 
 Red Dons - Escaping Amman 7-inch 
 Siege - Drop Dead 
 Smalltown - The Music LP/CD 
 Smalltown - Years, Months 7-inch 
 Smalltown - The First Three Years CD 
 The Stakeout - On The Run LP/CD 
 Statues - Same Bodies, Same Faces 7-inch
 Tear it Up - Just Can't Stand It LP 
 Tear it Up- The First Four Months CD 
 Tenement - The Blind Wink LP
 Tenement - The Self-Titled Album
 United Super Villains - Choke Slammed... LP 
 Vacant State - Internal Conflict E.P.
Vicious Cycle - Pale Blue Dot
 Violent Minds - We Are Nothing
 Wastoids - S/T 7-inch
 White Lung - Magazine 7-inch
 White Lung - It's the Evil 
 White Lung - Sorry 
 Food not Bombs - comp LP 
 Wolfbrigade - Comalive

References

External links

See also
 List of record labels
 Canadian hardcore punk

Canadian independent record labels
Punk record labels
Record labels established in 1997